Western Springs is a village located in Cook County, Illinois, United States, and is a suburb of Chicago. As of the 2010 census, the village had a total population of 12,975. It is twinned with Rugeley, Staffordshire, United Kingdom. In July 1962, the towns made telephone history on national television when the chairman of Rugeley Urban District Council made the first telephone call via the new Telstar satellite to the mayor of Western Springs.

History

Western Springs, an affluent suburb located along the Burlington Northern Santa Fe (formerly the Chicago, Burlington & Quincy Railroad) between Chicago and Aurora, encompasses roughly the area between Willow Springs Road (Gilbert Avenue), Ogden Avenue, Interstate 294, and West Plainfield Road. Named for local mineral springs on the southwest side of town, Western Springs originally consisted of flat prairie land with a swamp on its western border.

Around the turn of the 18th century, nomadic Potawatomi Native Americans settled in the Western Springs area. Whether they built a village is unclear, but evidence of temporary campsites has been found near Flagg Creek in Forest Hills. The natives were gone by the end of 1835, but Potawatomi artifacts may still be found buried in the Springdale neighborhood. The last Cook County campground of the Potawatomi was within what is now the Timber Trails subdivision.

The first known settler in the area near Western Springs was Elijah Wentworth. By 1834, after the Black Hawk War, farmer Joseph Vial had moved from New York and built a cabin along what is now Plainfield Road, a former Native American trail in the south of Western Springs. This cabin served as a stagecoach station, hotel, general store, and post office for the entire area. In 1872, Hill moved to the area from Chicago, and the community began organizing to attract more commuters. Residents built a wooden schoolhouse (1872) and a post office (1873).

The CB&Q Railroad built a line through Western Springs in 1863, filling in much of the westside swamp in the process. In 1870, the Western Springs Land Association, consisting of promoter Thomas Clarkson Hill, William Page and two sons of Phillip F. W. Peck, bought the three tracts that make up the area for $105,000.

In 1885, the Grand Avenue School replaced the wooden schoolhouse, and the office of village marshal was created as a combination policeman, dogcatcher, and groundskeeper. In 1886, the Friend's Church (razed in 1958) was built on the corner of Walnut and Woodland. That same year, Western Springs incorporated as a village by a public vote of 34 to 25. The voting townspeople elected a prominent Quaker developer, T. C. Hill, as the town's first president.

A large number of early residents were Quakers, and deeds often prohibited the sale of alcohol. (Until recently, the village itself had not permitted the sale of alcoholic beverages but currently a number of establishments do sell such.) Over time, with increased commuter settlement, Western Springs came to look less and less Quaker.

After the spring dried up in 1890, the village hired engineers Edgar and Benezette Williams to build the village waterworks system, including the famous water tower. Replaced in 1962, it became a museum in 1970 and entered the National Register of Historic Places in 1981.

Western Springs added many improvements over the years, including a fire department (1894), electric plant (1898), telephones (1899), a park district (1923), and a library (1926). The village expanded south of 47th Street, annexing the subdivisions of Forest Hills (1927), Springdale (1955), and Ridgewood (1973). On March 21, 2005, the Village of Western Springs annexed the former Timber Trails golf course, which is now being developed into a new community of single-family homes and townhomes. The property added  to the village.

Geography
Western Springs is located at 41°48'20" North, 87°54'4" West (41.805531, -87.901035).

Demographics
As of the 2020 census there were 13,629 people, 4,460 households, and 3,844 families residing in the village. The racial makeup of the village was 91.42% White, 0.46% African American, 0.07% Native American, 1.80% Asian, 0.01% Pacific Islander, 0.80% from other races, and 5.44% from two or more races. Hispanic or Latino of any race were 4.58% of the population.

There were 4,460 households, out of which 90.54% had children under the age of 18 living with them, 78.45% were married couples living together, 6.77% had a female householder with no husband present, and 13.81% were non-families. 13.61% of all households were made up of individuals, and 7.83% had someone living alone who was 65 years of age or older. The average household size was 3.27 and the average family size was 2.96.

The village's age distribution consisted of 31.3% under the age of 18, 4.7% from 18 to 24, 17.3% from 25 to 44, 32.5% from 45 to 64, and 14.2% who were 65 years of age or older. The median age was 42.3 years. For every 100 females, there were 101.2 males. For every 100 females age 18 and over, there were 94.5 males.

The median income for a household in the village was $184,412, and the median income for a family was $194,731. Males had a median income of $122,670 versus $51,733 for females. The per capita income for the village was $80,877. About 1.8% of families and 3.0% of the population were below the poverty line, including 3.0% of those under age 18 and 1.1% of those age 65 or over.

Government
Western Springs' village president is Alice Gallagher (2017). It is in Illinois's 3rd congressional district; the district's former congressman, Dan Lipinski, is a resident of the village.  His father, Bill Lipinski, was a longtime congressman of the 3rd district, and was able to get his son to replace him on the ballot, though he had not lived in Illinois for 15 years. Marie Newman defeated Lipinski in 2020, but, due to statewide redistricting, was forced in the 2022 Democratic primary to compete with neighboring incumbent Sean Casten. On June 28, 2022, Newman lost the primary to Casten.

Transportation

One major highway traverses Western Springs; Ogden Avenue (U.S. Route 34) runs east–west along the northern border and intersects the Tri-State Tollway (I-294) on the western border. The main north–south street in the village is Wolf Road, designated as a Blue Star Memorial Highway.

The BNSF Railway runs through Western Springs. Daily commuter service on that line, connecting Aurora and Chicago, is provided by Metra. Freight rail traffic on the line is heavy, with BNSF operating freight trains on all three mainline routes through the village. During non-rush hours, a freight train may run along the line as frequently as once every 10 minutes on average. Amtrak also runs this subdivision with passenger trains such as the Southwest Chief and the Illinois Zephyr. All told, the BNSF and Amtrak run up to 130 trains a day through Western Springs: Eight Amtrak trains in both directions, 96 Metra trains from morning to midnight, and around 25 or more freight trains. Sometimes, around 145 trains can come through. A typical BNSF train contains 100 to 125 cars, mainly consisting of coal cars and intermodal trains. Metra runs five to 11 cars per train, with the average being six cars.

A new train station was built in 2004–2005. The north platform was remodeled in 2008, and the extended platform was connected to Wolf Road in 2019. The new station is a virtual replica of a train station that was demolished in 1972. Passenger airline service is available at O'Hare and Midway airports, both located in Chicago. Commuter bus service is provided by Pace, the suburban bus division of the Regional Transportation Authority.

Education
The Village of Western Springs is served by three public elementary school districts and one public high school district.

Western Springs School District 101 serves the original neighborhoods of Western Springs and is comprised four school: Field Park, Forest Hills, and Laidlaw Elementary Schools serve K-5 students and McClure Junior High serves students in grades 6–8. LaGrange Highlands School District 106 serves students from other, newer neighborhoods (e.g., Ridgewood) and operates two schools: La Grange Highlands Elementary, which serves K-4 students, and La Grange Highlands Middle School for students in grades 5–8.

All elementary and middle schools that serve Western Springs feed into Lyons Township High School District 204. Lyons Township High School has two campuses: Freshmen and Sophomores attend the South Campus in Western Springs, and Juniors and Seniors attend the North Campus in LaGrange.

Health
AMITA Health Adventist Medical Center La Grange, operated by AMITA Health Medical Group, is a level-two trauma center. The hospital has 270 inpatient beds. A $79 million renovation and expansion of the facility was completed in early 2007. It is 3 miles from downtown Western Springs.

Parks

Ridge Acres Park
Ridgewood Park
Laidlaw Park
Spring Rock Park (1931)
Springdale Park
Forest Hills Park
Clark Park
Northeast Park (previously known as "Candy Cane Park")
Field Park
Timber Trails Park (2005)
Sereda Park

Recreation
The Western Springs Service Club (WSSC) is Western Springs' private pool. The pool was formed in 1954 and officially opened in 1955. There was an addition made in 1965 and a renovation in 1996. The WSSC provides recreational swimming, swim team for ages 6 to 18, water aerobics, lap swimming, and swim lessons for members of the Service Club. On top of the infant pool, two swimming pools with slides and a diving board, the WSSC also includes a grass volleyball court and a GaGa pit. The facility also provides an outdoor snack shop and locker rooms. The property may also be used for birthday parties, relaxation, picnics, or meetings.

Western Springs has a public library, the Thomas Ford Memorial Library. The library building at 800 Chestnut St. opened in 1932. Additions to the building were completed in 1962 and 1996. The library serves both children and adults and is part of the suburban library system. Patrons have access to programs such as story hour, book groups, and film groups.

Western Springs includes two recreational centers. The Recreation Center and the Grand Avenue Community Center are both about four blocks from downtown Western Springs. These recreation centers provides many classes, sports, events, and activities for anyone who desires to be active.

Notable people

 Robert Barron, Roman Catholic bishop
 Emil J. Boucek, state representative 
 Brian Campbell, former defenseman for NHL's Chicago Blackhawks
 Terrel E. Clarke, Illinois state legislator and businessman
 Jack Collom, poet and teacher
 Melinda Culea, actress
 Steve Dahl, radio personality, podcaster
 Taylor Davis, violinist
 Jim Durkin, Minority Leader of the Illinois House of Representatives 
 Jake Elliott, NFL kicker
 Cameron Esposito, comedian
 Eileen Lyons, state representative
 Jonathan Franzen, novelist
 John Hattendorf, maritime historian
 John Kass, columnist for Chicago Tribune
 Dan Lipinski, United States congressman
 Walter M. Urbain, food scientist
 James "J.Y." Young, guitarist for Styx
 Suzy Glowiak, state senator from the 24th State Senate District

Twin town
Western Springs is twinned with Rugeley, England.

References

External links
Village of Western Springs official website
Western Springs Historical Society
Thomas Ford Memorial Library

 
Chicago metropolitan area
Villages in Cook County, Illinois
Villages in Illinois
Populated places established in 1886
1886 establishments in Illinois